Yaaba is a 1989 Burkinabé drama film written, produced, and directed by Idrissa Ouedraogo, "one of the best known films from francophone sub-Saharan Africa". It won the Sakura Gold prize at the 1989 Tokyo Film Festival. The film was selected as the Burkinabé entry for the Best Foreign Language Film at the 62nd Academy Awards, but was not accepted as a nominee.

The film was the subject of a short documentary Parlons Grand-mère, which was shot during the film's production by Djibril Diop Mambéty.

Plot
In a Mossi village in Burkina Faso, Bila (Noufou Ouédraogo), a ten-year-old boy, makes friends with an old woman called Sana (Fatimata Sanga), who has been accused of witchcraft by her village, and has become a social outcast. Only Bila is respectful of her, and calls her yaaba (Grandmother).

When Bila's cousin, Nopoko (Roukietou Barry), falls ill, a medicine man insists that Sana has stolen the girl's soul. Sana undergoes a long and gruelling but ultimately successful journey to find a medicine to save Nopoko's life, but is still treated as a witch.

After Sana dies, the real reason why she is hated in the village is uncovered, but the love and wisdom she invested in Bila and Nopoko lives on.

Awards 
 FIPRESCI Prize (Cannes, 1989)

See also
 List of submissions to the 62nd Academy Awards for Best Foreign Language Film
 List of Sub-Saharan African submissions for the Academy Award for Best Foreign Language Film

References

External links
 
 
Cinema Then, Cinema Now: Yaaba a 1994 discussion of the film hosted by Jerry Carlson of CUNY TV

1989 films
1989 drama films
Films directed by Idrissa Ouedraogo
Films set in Burkina Faso
More-language films
Burkinabé independent films
French independent films
Swiss independent films
Films set in pre-colonial sub-Saharan Africa
1989 independent films
Burkinabé drama films
1980s French films